This is a list of media in the Fraser Valley, British Columbia. Due to its proximity to Vancouver, most TV and radio broadcasters in that city are also received throughout the valley, although as noted below in a few cases there are repeater stations licensed to different centres in the region. See Media in Vancouver for other media outlets not listed below.

Some stations from Seattle, Washington, USA are also received in the Fraser Valley due to its close proximity to the border.

Radio

Television
The Fraser Valley is counted as part of the Vancouver television market, and most Vancouver stations are easily receivable in the area.

Print
Abbotsford News
Chilliwack Progress
Mission City Record
Maple Ridge News
Hope Standard
Agassiz Harrison Observer
Vancouver's two dailies, the Vancouver Sun and Vancouver Province are also available throughout the valley.

Online
 TheValleyVoice.ca
 MyChilliwackNews.com
 AbbyNews.com
 TheProgress.com
 MissionCityRecord.com
 HopeStandard.com
 AgassizHarrisonObserver.com
 AbbotsfordTimes.com

Fraser Valley
Media, Fraser Valley